Grand Trunk Western No. 4070 is a class "S-3-a" 2-8-2 type USRA Light Mikado steam locomotive originally built by the American Locomotive Company (ALCO) in December 1918 for the Grand Trunk as No. 474, later re-numbered by Grand Trunk Western Railroad, after the GT was absorbed into Canadian National as GTW No. 3734. In the late 1950s the locomotive was given a larger tender, from an S-3-c, and re-numbered 4070. The locomotive has pulled passenger excursions in Illinois, Indiana, Ohio and Pennsylvania over the years.

History

Revenue service
Grand Trunk Western 4070 was built in December 1918 by the American Locomotive Company (ALCO) in Schenectady, New York and assigned to Grand Trunk, which numbered it originally as 474. Sometime in the 1930s a Coffin feedwater heater was installed, and with other improvements, the number was changed by the GTW to 3734. This steam locomotive's road career consisted of pulling freight and passenger services in Michigan. After falling into a turntable in June 1955, the locomotive was shopped and given a larger tender, and the locomotive's number was changed to 4070. The 4070 continued to pull regular duty until March 29, 1960, when it pulled its final revenue freight, from Pontiac to Durand, MI and then was retired. In 1961, Lou Keller, a member of the National Railway Historical Society's Iowa chapter purchased 4070. In 1966 the Midwest Railway Historical Foundation (now MRPS) acquired the locomotive on a five-year lease and was moved into storage under the Cleveland Union Terminal. It was then moved to Chicago in 1967, where it was restored to operating condition by Richard Jensen and his crew, who also worked on fellow GTW USRA locomotive No. 5629.

Life after the Grand Trunk

4070 operated for the first time again on November 3, 1968, by pulling a passenger excursion from Dearborn Station, Chicago to South Bend, Ind. commemorating the 50th anniversary of her build date in 1918. An additional excursion was also made from these two points on March 23, 1969. On August 31, 1969, 4070 pulled a passenger fan trip from Erie to Greenville, Pennsylvania on the Bessemer and Lake Erie Railroad. The 4070 was also used at Conneaut Lake Park in PA. In 1971, MRHF bought out the lease. In 1975 it was selected to be used on the newly created Cuyahoga Valley Line - now known as the Cuyahoga Valley Scenic Railroad. In 1977, the 4070 performed a doubleheader along the famed Horseshoe Curve with Reading T-1 4-8-4 "Northern" 2102. However, that trip was plagued with mechanical issues; while on the curve, the 4070 threw an eccentric rod, and the busy Conrail line where their train sat had to be shut down for several hours. After the incident, Conrail banned steam operations for the next several years. The 4070 had its rods repaired and was brought back to pull passenger trains on the Cuyahoga Valley Line. Additionally, in 1983, the locomotive was painted as Chicago, Burlington and Quincy 4070, and run to South Dayton, NY, for filming in the movie The Natural, starring Robert Redford, and released in 1984. After the movie, it continued service on the CVL until encountering mechanical difficulties in 1990. Upon inspection, 4070 was found to be in need of repairs. Seeing that the cost of the repairs would be prohibitive, 4070  was once again retired from service.

Second restoration
In 2011 the process started of restoring the locomotive to operational condition at the Midwest Railway Preservation Society in Cleveland, Ohio. The locomotive boiler and tender have both been tested using ultrasound. The locomotive must have its drypipe, and front and rear tube sheets replaced. In addition, the smokebox, firebox, frame, running gear, driving boxes, tender and many assorted parts all need major work before 4070 can be operational. The  estimated cost of 4070's restoration is $1,290,000. As of 2022, the MRPS has re-organized their portion of the roundhouse for more suitable space to work on No. 4070, and they have seamed the crack the locomotive's frame has had from its 1955 incident. It will likely be a few more years before the locomotive would be ready to steam up again.

In popular culture
The engine made a special "guest appearance" in the 1984 movie The Natural, starring Robert Redford. The movie portion was filmed on the NY&LE railroad, in South Dayton, New York.

Other preserved 2-8-2s
Canadian National 3254
Nickel Plate Road 587
Grand Canyon Railway 4960
Southern Railway 4501
Soo Line 1003

References
 "Evening Before The Diesel" by Charles R. Foss

External links
Railroad Picture Archive: GTW 4070

2-8-2 locomotives
 ALCO locomotives
 Individual locomotives of the United States
 Railway locomotives introduced in 1918
 Standard gauge locomotives of the United States
Preserved steam locomotives of Ohio
4070

 Steamlocomotive.com